This list consists of American college football players who have been elected to the College Football Hall of Fame.

A

B

C

D

E

F

G

H

I

J

K

See also
 List of College Football Hall of Fame inductees (players, L–Z)
 List of College Football Hall of Fame inductees (coaches)

 List of College Football Hall of Fame inductees (players, A-K)
Hall of Fame inductees (players, A-K)